Uriah Jones (December 15, 1924 – June 14, 2000) was an American fencer. He competed in the team foil event at the 1968 Summer Olympics.

Career 
In 1968, Jones became the first African-American fencer to represent the United States at the Olympics. He was also a member of the U.S. National, U.S. World, and U.S. Pan American championship teams.
 Jones competed for the Salle Santelli club, winning three titles in 1964, 1968, and 1972. Jones won several championships, winning six Connecticut championships, four North Atlantic championships, and two American championships. He also won medals on four occasions while competing in the international Martini and Rossi international tournament.

At the age of 50, Jones opened up his own club in Connecticut. One of his most successful students, Elaine Cheris, became a two-time Olympian.

In 1999, Jones was elected to the US Fencing Association Hall of Fame and inducted posthumously.

References

External links
 

1924 births
2000 deaths
American male foil fencers
Olympic fencers of the United States
Fencers at the 1968 Summer Olympics
Sportspeople from New York (state)
Pan American Games medalists in fencing
Pan American Games gold medalists for the United States
Pan American Games bronze medalists for the United States
Fencers at the 1971 Pan American Games